Tom Edmonds is a veteran Republican political media consultant. His Washington DC-based firm,  Edmonds Associates, Inc., has received over 100 national awards for its communications strategies on behalf of presidential, senatorial, congressional and gubernatorial candidates. Campaigns & Elections Politics magazine has called Edmonds "the issue/advocacy guru" for his work with some of the U.S.'s largest issue/advocacy groups.

Edmonds is currently president of the International Association of Political Consultants. He is a past president of the American Association of Political Consultants, and received its Lifetime Achievement Award in 2005.

In 1986, he was one of a small group of political consultants who helped create the Graduate School of Political Management at George Washington University in Washington, DC.

He is the author of two books on politics and public policy. He has produced a number of documentaries, including the official video biography of President Ronald Reagan, A Tribute to Ronald Reagan : An American President.

Bibliography

Edmonds, Tom, Ken Lisbeth, Landon Parvin, Jaime Gonzalez, Mike Pengra, and Patrick Smith. A Tribute to Ronald Reagan An American President. Bethesda, MD: Acorn Media Pub, 2003.

References

External links

Living people
Year of birth missing (living people)